Around 380 species are currently recognised in the peat-moss genus Sphagnum:

A

Sphagnum aciphyllum Müll. Hal.
Sphagnum acutifolioides Warnst.
Sphagnum acutirameum H.A. Crum
Sphagnum aequalipunctatum H.A. Crum
Sphagnum aequiporosum Warnst.
Sphagnum affine Renauld & Cardot
Sphagnum africanum Welw. & Duby
Sphagnum alaskense R.E. Andrus & Janssens
Sphagnum alegrense Warnst.
Sphagnum algentryi H.A. Crum
Sphagnum amazonense H.A. Crum
Sphagnum amazonicum H.A. Crum & W.R. Buck
Sphagnum amoenoides H.A. Crum
Sphagnum amoenum Warnst.
Sphagnum andersonianum R.E. Andrus
Sphagnum andrusii (H.A. Crum) Flatberg
Sphagnum angermanicum Melin
Sphagnum angustifolium (Warnst.) C.E.O. Jensen
Sphagnum annulatum Warnst.
Sphagnum antarense Wijk & Zanten
Sphagnum antioquiense H.A. Crum
Sphagnum aongstroemii C. Hartm.
Sphagnum arcticum Flatberg & Frisvoll
Sphagnum atlanticum R.E. Andrus
Sphagnum atroligneum H.A. Crum
Sphagnum austinii Sull.
Sphagnum australe Mitt.
Sphagnum austro-americanum H.A. Crum
Sphagnum azuayense H.A. Crum

B

Sphagnum balslevii H.A. Crum
Sphagnum balticum (Russow) C.E.O. Jensen
Sphagnum barclayae H.A. Crum
Sphagnum bartlettianum Warnst.
Sphagnum beccarii Hampe
Sphagnum beothuk R.E. Andrus
Sphagnum bergianum R.E. Andrus
Sphagnum beringiense A.J. Shaw, R.E. Andrus & B. Shaw
Sphagnum billbuckii H.A. Crum
Sphagnum bocainense H.A. Crum
Sphagnum boliviae Warnst.
Sphagnum boomii H.A. Crum
Sphagnum bordasii Besch.
Sphagnum borneoense Warnst.
Sphagnum bourbonense H.A. Crum
Sphagnum boyacanum H.A. Crum
Sphagnum brachybolax Müll. Hal. ex Warnst.
Sphagnum brachycaulon Müll. Hal. ex Warnst.
Sphagnum brasiliense Warnst.
Sphagnum breedlovei H.A. Crum
Sphagnum brevifolium (Lindb.) Roll
Sphagnum brevirameum Hampe
Sphagnum buckianum H.A. Crum

C

Sphagnum calymmatophyllum Warnst. & Cardot
Sphagnum campbellianum Müll. Hal.
Sphagnum camusii (Cardot) Warnst.
Sphagnum capense Hornsch.
Sphagnum capillifolium (Ehrh.) Hedw.
Sphagnum carneum Müll. Hal. & Warnst.
Sphagnum carolinianum R.E. Andrus
Sphagnum cavernulosum Flatberg & Whinam
Sphagnum centrale C.E.O. Jensen
Sphagnum ceylonicum Mitt. ex Warnst.
Sphagnum chevalieri Warnst.
Sphagnum chi-chinese H.A. Crum
Sphagnum chinense Brid.
Sphagnum cleefii H.A. Crum
Sphagnum columniforme H.A. Crum
Sphagnum compactum Lam. & DC.
Sphagnum complanatum Flatberg & Whinam
Sphagnum concinnum (Berggr.) Flatberg
Sphagnum condensatum Brid.
Sphagnum conflatum Müll. Hal. ex Warnst.
Sphagnum connectens Warnst. & Cardot
Sphagnum contortulum H.A. Crum
Sphagnum contortum Schultz
Sphagnum coryphaeum Warnst.
Sphagnum costae H.A. Crum & Pinheiro da Costa
Sphagnum crassiangulatum Griazeva
Sphagnum cribriforme H.A. Crum
Sphagnum cribrosum Lindb.
Sphagnum crispatum H.A. Crum
Sphagnum cristatum Hampe
Sphagnum cruegeri Cardot
Sphagnum crumii Schaf.-Verw.
Sphagnum cucullatum Warnst.
Sphagnum cuculliforme H.A. Crum
Sphagnum cundinamarcanum H.A. Crum
Sphagnum curicuriariense H.A. Crum & W.R. Buck
Sphagnum curvatulum H.A. Crum
Sphagnum cuspidatulum Müll. Hal.
Sphagnum cuspidatum Ehrh. ex Hoffm.
Sphagnum cyclocladum Warnst.
Sphagnum cyclophyllum Sull. & Lesq.

D

Sphagnum davidii Warnst.
Sphagnum delamboyense Schaf.-Verw.
Sphagnum delicatum Griazeva
Sphagnum densirameum Dixon
Sphagnum denticulatum Brid.
Sphagnum derrumbense Warnst.
Sphagnum diblastoides H.A. Crum
Sphagnum diblastum Müll. Hal.
Sphagnum dicladum Warnst.
Sphagnum dimorphophyllum H.A. Crum & W.R. Buck
Sphagnum dissimile Roiv.
Sphagnum divisum H.A. Crum
Sphagnum dominii Kavina
Sphagnum dubiosum Warnst.
Sphagnum dusenioides Roiv.

E

Sphagnum efibrillosum A.L. Andrews
Sphagnum ehyalinum A.J. Shaw & Goffinet
Sphagnum elenkini Semenov
Sphagnum engelii H.A. Crum
Sphagnum ericetorum Brid.
Sphagnum eschowense Warnst.
Sphagnum exile H.A. Crum
Sphagnum exquisitum H.A. Crum

F

Sphagnum falcatulum Besch.
Sphagnum falcatum (Russow) Limpr.
Sphagnum fallax H. Klinggr.
Sphagnum fimbriatum Wilson
Sphagnum fitzgeraldii Renauld & Cardot
Sphagnum flaccidifolium Dixon ex A. Johnson
Sphagnum flaccidum Besch.
Sphagnum flavicaule Warnst.
Sphagnum flavicomans (Cardot) Warnst.
Sphagnum flexuosum Dozy & Molk.
Sphagnum fontanum Müll. Hal.
Sphagnum frahmii H.A. Crum
Sphagnum fraudulentum H.A. Crum
Sphagnum funkiae H.A. Crum
Sphagnum fuscovinosum Seppelt & H.A. Crum
Sphagnum fuscum (Schimp.) H. Klinggr.

G

Sphagnum garysmithii H.A. Crum
Sphagnum geraisense H.A. Crum
Sphagnum girgensohnii Russow
Sphagnum globicephalum Müll. Hal. ex Warnst.
Sphagnum gomezii H.A. Crum
Sphagnum gordjogini Semenov
Sphagnum gracile Michx.
Sphagnum gracilescens Hampe ex Müll. Hal.
Sphagnum griseum Warnst.
Sphagnum guanabarae H.A. Crum
Sphagnum guwassanense Warnst.

H

Sphagnum hamiltonii H.A. Crum
Sphagnum hampeanum Venturi
Sphagnum harleyi H.A. Crum
Sphagnum hegewaldii H.A. Crum
Sphagnum helenicum Warnst.
Sphagnum helmsii Warnst.
Sphagnum henryense Warnst.
Sphagnum hercynicum Warnst.
Sphagnum hertelianum H.A. Crum
Sphagnum herteri H.A. Crum
Sphagnum holtii Warnst.
Sphagnum homophyllum H.A. Crum
Sphagnum huilense H.A. Crum
Sphagnum hypnoides (A. Braun ex Bruch) Brid.

I

Sphagnum imbricatum Hornsch. ex Russow
Sphagnum imperforatum H.A. Crum
Sphagnum incertum Warnst. & Cardot
Sphagnum incommodum H.A. Crum
Sphagnum inexspectatum Flatberg
Sphagnum inretortum H.A. Crum (now placed in genus Eosphagnum in Ambuchananiaceae)
Sphagnum inundatum Russow
Sphagnum irwinii H.A. Crum
Sphagnum isophyllum (Russow) Russow
Sphagnum isoviitae Flatberg
Sphagnum itabense H.A. Crum & W.R. Buck
Sphagnum itatiaiae Müll. Hal. & Warnst.

J

Sphagnum jensenii H. Lindb.
Sphagnum juliforme H.A. Crum
Sphagnum junghuhnianum Dozy & Molk.

K

Sphagnum kenaiense R.E. Andrus
Sphagnum khasianum Mitt.
Sphagnum kiiense Warnst.
Sphagnum krylovi Semenov
Sphagnum kushiroense H. Suzuki

L

Sphagnum laceratum Müll. Hal. & Warnst.
Sphagnum laegaardii H.A. Crum
Sphagnum lankesteri H.A. Crum
Sphagnum lapazense H.A. Crum
Sphagnum laxirameum H.A. Crum
Sphagnum laxiramosum H.A. Crum
Sphagnum laxulum H.A. Crum
Sphagnum lenense Pohle
Sphagnum leonii H.A. Crum
Sphagnum lescurii Sull.
Sphagnum leucobryoides T. Yamag., Seppelt & Z. Iwats. (now placed in genus Ambuchanania in family  Ambuchananiaceae)
Sphagnum lewisii H.A. Crum
Sphagnum liesneri H.A. Crum
Sphagnum limbatum Mitt.
Sphagnum lindbergii Schimp.
Sphagnum livonicum (Russow ex Warnst.) G. Roth
Sphagnum lojense H.A. Crum
Sphagnum longicomosum Müll. Hal. ex Warnst.
Sphagnum longistolo Müll. Hal.
Sphagnum loricatum Müll. Hal.
Sphagnum luetzelburgii H.K.G. Paul ex H.A. Crum
Sphagnum luzonense Warnst.

M

Sphagnum macrophyllum Bernh. ex Brid.
Sphagnum maegdefraui H. Suzuki
Sphagnum magellanicum Brid.
Sphagnum magistri H.A. Crum
Sphagnum majus (Russow) C.E.O. Jensen
Sphagnum mathieui Warnst.
Sphagnum matogrossense H.A. Crum
Sphagnum mcqueenii R.E. Andrus
Sphagnum mendocinum Sull.
Sphagnum meridense (Hampe) Müll. Hal.
Sphagnum microcarpum Warnst.
Sphagnum microcuspidatum H.A. Crum
Sphagnum microporum Warnst. ex Cardot
Sphagnum minutulum Müll. Hal. & Warnst.
Sphagnum miquelonense (Renauld & Cardot) Warnst.
Sphagnum mirabile Müll. Hal. & Warnst.
Sphagnum mirum Flatberg & Thingsg.
Sphagnum mississippiense R.E. Andrus
Sphagnum molle Sull.
Sphagnum molliculum Mitt.
Sphagnum moronum H.A. Crum
Sphagnum mosenii Warnst.
Sphagnum multifibrosum X.J. Li & M. Zang
Sphagnum multiporosum H.A. Crum

N

Sphagnum negrense Mitt.
Sphagnum nemoreum Scop.
Sphagnum nepalense H. Suzuki
Sphagnum nitidulum Warnst.
Sphagnum nitidum Warnst.
Sphagnum noryungasense H.A. Crum
Sphagnum novae-caledoniae Paris & Warnst.
Sphagnum novo-guineense M. Fleisch. & Warnst.
Sphagnum novo-zelandicum Mitt.

O

Sphagnum obliquefibrosum H.A. Crum
Sphagnum obtusiusculum Lindb. ex Warnst.
Sphagnum obtusum Warnst.
Sphagnum olafii Flatberg
Sphagnum oligoporum Warnst. & Cardot
Sphagnum oregonense R.E. Andrus
Sphagnum orientale L.I. Savicz
Sphagnum ornatum H.A. Crum
Sphagnum orthocladum Bryhn
Sphagnum ovalifolium Warnst.
Sphagnum ovatum Hampe
Sphagnum oxyphyllum Warnst.

P

Sphagnum pacificum Flatberg
Sphagnum pallens Warnst. & Cardot
Sphagnum palustre L.
Sphagnum papillosum Lindb.
Sphagnum paranense H.A. Crum
Sphagnum parcoramosum H.A. Crum
Sphagnum patulum (Schimp.) Roll
Sphagnum pauciporosum Warnst.
Sphagnum pendulirameum H.A. Crum
Sphagnum perfoliatum L.I. Savicz
Sphagnum perforatum Warnst.
Sphagnum perichaetiale Hampe
Sphagnum perrieri Thér.
Sphagnum personatum Roiv.
Sphagnum planifolium Müll. Hal.
Sphagnum platyphylloides Warnst.
Sphagnum platyphylloideum Warnst.
Sphagnum platyphyllum (Lindb.) Warnst.
Sphagnum plumulosum Roll
Sphagnum pluriporosum H.A. Crum
Sphagnum poasense H.A. Crum
Sphagnum portoricense Hampe
Sphagnum priceae H.A. Crum
Sphagnum procerum Schimp. ex Warnst.
Sphagnum pseudomedium Warnst.
Sphagnum pseudoramulinum H.A. Crum
Sphagnum pulchrum (Lindb.) Warnst.
Sphagnum pulvinatum H.A. Crum
Sphagnum punctaesporites Rouse
Sphagnum pungens G. Roth
Sphagnum pungifolium X.J. Li
Sphagnum pycnocladulum Müll. Hal.
Sphagnum pylaesii Brid.

Q

Sphagnum quinquefarium (Lindb.) Warnst.

R

Sphagnum ramulinum Warnst.
Sphagnum reclinatum H.A. Crum
Sphagnum recurvum P. Beauv.
Sphagnum reichardtii Hampe
Sphagnum richardsianum H.A. Crum
Sphagnum rio-negrense H.A. Crum
Sphagnum riparium Ångström
Sphagnum ripense H.A. Crum & W.R. Buck
Sphagnum robinsonii Warnst.
Sphagnum robustum (Warnst.) Roll
Sphagnum roraimense Warnst.
Sphagnum roseum Warnst.
Sphagnum rotundatum Müll. Hal. & Warnst.
Sphagnum rotundifolium Müll. Hal. & Warnst.
Sphagnum rubellum Wilson
Sphagnum rubiginosum Flatberg
Sphagnum rubroflexuosum R.E. Andrus
Sphagnum rugegense Warnst.
Sphagnum rugense Warnst.
Sphagnum russowii Warnst.
Sphagnum rutenbergii Müll. Hal.

S

Sphagnum sancto-josephense H.A. Crum & Crosby
Sphagnum sanguinale Warnst.
Sphagnum santanderense H.A. Crum
Sphagnum schliephackeanum (Warnst.) Roll
Sphagnum schultzii Warnst.
Sphagnum schwabeanum H.K.G. Paul
Sphagnum scorpioides (Hampe) H.A. Crum
Sphagnum sehnemii H.A. Crum
Sphagnum semisquarrosum (Russow) Lepage
Sphagnum septatoporosum H.A. Crum
Sphagnum septatum Warnst.
Sphagnum sericeum Müll. Hal. (transferred to genus Flatbergium in family Flatbergiaceae)
Sphagnum simplex Fife
Sphagnum simplicicaulis H.A. Crum
Sphagnum simplicissimum Lour.
Sphagnum sipmanii H.A. Crum
Sphagnum sitchense R.E. Andrus
Sphagnum skyense Flatberg
Sphagnum slooveri A. Eddy
Sphagnum sonsonense H.A. Crum
Sphagnum sordidum Müll. Hal. ex Warnst.
Sphagnum sparsum Hampe
Sphagnum speciosum (Russow) H. Klinggr.
Sphagnum splendens Maass
Sphagnum squarrifolium Warnst.
Sphagnum squarrosum Crome
Sphagnum steerei R.E. Andrus
Sphagnum stollei Roll
Sphagnum strictum Sull.
Sphagnum subacutifolium Schimp.
Sphagnum subaequifolium Hampe
Sphagnum subbalticum Warnst.
Sphagnum subditivum H.A. Crum
Sphagnum subfalcatulum Roiv.
Sphagnum subfulvum Sjors
Sphagnum subhomophyllum H.A. Crum
Sphagnum submedium Warnst.
Sphagnum subnitens Russow & Warnst.
Sphagnum subobesum Warnst.
Sphagnum subovalifolium Müll. Hal. & Warnst.
Sphagnum subrigidum Hampe & Lorentz
Sphagnum subrufescens Warnst.
Sphagnum subsecundoides H.A. Crum & W.R. Buck
Sphagnum subsecundum Nees
Sphagnum subserratum Roiv.
Sphagnum subtile (Russow) Warnst.
Sphagnum sucrei H.A. Crum
Sphagnum sumapazense H.A. Crum

T

Sphagnum tabuleirense O. Yano & H.A. Crum
Sphagnum talbotianum R.E. Andrus
Sphagnum tenellum (Brid.) Brid.
Sphagnum tenerum Sull. & Lesq. ex Sull.
Sphagnum teres (Schimp.) Ångström
Sphagnum tescorum Flatberg
Sphagnum torreyanum Sull.
Sphagnum tosaense Warnst.
Sphagnum triangulare (Mamczar) N.O. Fred.
Sphagnum trinitense Müll. Hal.
Sphagnum triporosum H.A. Crum
Sphagnum trirameum H.A. Crum
Sphagnum troendelagicum Flatberg
Sphagnum trollii H.A. Crum
Sphagnum truncatum Hornsch.
Sphagnum tumidulum Besch.
Sphagnum tundrae Flatberg
Sphagnum turgens Warnst.
Sphagnum turgescens Warnst.
Sphagnum typicum Meyl.

U

Sphagnum uleanum Müll. Hal.
Sphagnum umbrosum Warnst.
Sphagnum uruguayense H.A. Crum
Sphagnum usteri Warnst.

V

Sphagnum venustum Flatberg
Sphagnum veresczagini Semenov
Sphagnum versiporum Warnst.
Sphagnum violascens Müll. Hal.
Sphagnum viride Flatberg
Sphagnum vitalii H.A. Crum

W

Sphagnum warnstorfii Russow
Sphagnum weberi Warnst.
Sphagnum wheeleri Müll. Hal.
Sphagnum wilfii H.A. Crum
Sphagnum wulfianum Girg.

References

List
Sphagnum